Faith is a chondrite meteorite that was found in 1952 in Perkins County, South Dakota, United States.

See also
 Glossary of meteoritics

References

External links
 Meteoritical Bulletin: Entry for Faith - Lunar and Planetary Institute

Perkins County, South Dakota
Meteorites found in the United States
Geology of South Dakota